Bengasi is a station of the Turin Metro in Turin, Italy, opened on 23 April 2021. It was one of two stations opened in 2021 as part of the Line 1 southern extension. The station is located under Piazza Bengasi, near the city limits of Turin and Moncalieri. As of April 2021, it is the southernmost terminus station for Line 1, previously it was Lingotto.

Upon her visit to the construction site in November 2020, the mayor of Turin, Chiara Appendino, called the completion of Bengasi station a priority for her administration, acknowledging that the work, now in the final stages, has had a significant impact on the daily life of residents in the neighborhood. She also confirmed Spring 2021 as the scheduled opening to the public.

References

External links
 Official project page

Turin Metro stations
Railway stations opened in 2021
2021 establishments in Italy
Railway stations in Italy opened in the 21st century